Wind River Glacier is in the Wind River Range, Shoshone National Forest, in the U.S. state of Wyoming. The glacier is situated on the northeast slope of Wind River Peak, the tallest peak in the southern Wind River Range.

See also
 List of glaciers in the United States
 List of glaciers in Wyoming
 Retreat of glaciers since 1850

References

External links
Glaciers of the Winds 

Glaciers of Fremont County, Wyoming
Shoshone National Forest
Glaciers of Wyoming